It occurs naturally in tobacco leaves and artificially in industrial wastes. Exposure can cause excitement followed by depression, internal bleeding, dystrophy, and severe irritation.

References

Alkylamines
Secondary amines
Propyl compounds